Yağız Can Konyalı (born 20 September 1991) is a Turkish actor. He is mainly known for his role as Rahmet Elibol in the television series Bizim Hikaye.

Filmography

Awards

References 

1991 births
Living people
Turkish Muslims
Turkish male film actors
Turkish male television actors
Male actors from Istanbul